Provincial Road 242 (PR 242) is a provincial road in the south central region of Manitoba, Canada.

PR 242 begins at the Hannah–Snowflake Border Crossing on the Canada–United States border near Snowflake and terminates at Lynch Point on the south shore of Lake Manitoba, in the Municipality of WestLake – Gladstone.  It is a paved, two-lane road from the U.S. border to La Rivière (PTH 3) and from PTH 2 to the Trans-Canada Highway; the remainder is mostly gravel.

At the U.S. border, PR 242 connects with Cavalier County Road 13.

References

External links 
Manitoba Official Map - South Central

242